Mud Hen Lake or Mud Hen Lakes may refer to:

 Mud Hen Lake, Minnesota, a populated place
 Mud Hen Lake, a lake in Daniels, Wisconsin
 Mud Hen Lakes, lakes in Dakota County, Minnesota

See also 
 Mud hen (disambiguation)